Trixie Maristela (born April 30, 1986) is a Filipina actress, model, beauty queen titleholder as well as a European Languages graduate from the University of the Philippines based in Queensland, Australia. She finished her master's degree in Professional Accounting.

Career 

In May 2014, she joined Philippines's most prestigious transgender beauty pageant on national television, Eat Bulaga!'s Super Sireyna Worldwide. She had a chance to compete with other transgender beauty icons from all around the world. She ended as 1st runner-up.

In May 2015, she joined the first ever Miss Trans Manila and crowned winner.

In October 2015, Maristela and her partner Art Sta. Ana published a book named He's Dating The Transgender. The book is a memoir about Sta. Ana falling in love with Maristela.

In November 2015, she joined the Miss International Queen transgender beauty pageant in Pattaya, Thailand. She was crowned as the winner.

In February 2016, Maristela starred on GMA's drama anthology series Karelasyon, her first acting role on television. She played the role of Queen, a transgender woman who never stops loving despite her complicated love life. She also starred in another drama anthology series Magpakailanman on an episode that features the real-life story of Maristela.

Education 
Trixie Maristela studied European languages major in Spanish and minor in French at UP Diliman.

Filmography

Television

References

External links 
 Trixie Maristela on Facebook

Living people
Filipino beauty pageant winners
Transgender female models
Transgender writers
People from Makati
Filipino LGBT actors
Filipino LGBT writers
Filipino LGBT entertainers
University of the Philippines Diliman alumni
1986 births
Viva Artists Agency
Miss International Queen winners